Nikolay Shelenkov (28 November 1919 – 1985) was a Soviet equestrian. He competed at the 1952 Summer Olympics and the 1956 Summer Olympics.

References

External links
 

1919 births
1985 deaths
Soviet male equestrians
Olympic equestrians of the Soviet Union
Equestrians at the 1952 Summer Olympics
Equestrians at the 1956 Summer Olympics
Place of birth missing